DTE (direct to edit) is a digital video direct-to-disk recording method (and also refers to the associated equipment) used to streamline the post-production video editing workflow of raw video files into a non-linear editing system (NLE).  Recent developments have added solid-state memory recording units with removable modules or flash-cards, to avoid potential hard-drive problems.

See also
 Computer file
 Data storage device
 Digital video recorder (DVR)
 Flash memory
 Hard disk drive (HDD)
 Non-linear editing system (NLE)
 Professional video camera
 Tapeless camcorder
 Video editing software
 Video server

References

Digital video recorders
Recording devices
Television terminology